Cymothoe alticola, the mountain glider, is a butterfly in the family Nymphalidae. It is found in Cameroon. The habitat consists of montane forests at altitudes above 1,100 meters.

The larvae feed on Caloncoba species.

References

Butterflies described in 1997
Cymothoe (butterfly)
Endemic fauna of Cameroon
Butterflies of Africa